The Gyeongju Choe clan is a Korean clan, with a bon-gwan located in Gyeongju, North Gyeongsang Province. According to a census from 2015, the population of the Gyeongju Choe clan is 945,005 in South Korea.  The apical ancestor of the Gyeongju Choe clan is Choe Chiwon, a Confucian scholar and official during the Unified Silla period.

See also 
 Choi (Korean surname)

References 

Choe clans
Gyeongju Choe clan